Gattaz is a surname. Notable people with the surname include:

Carol Gattaz (born 1981), Brazilian volleyball player
Pierre Gattaz (born 1959), French businessman, son of Yvon
Yvon Gattaz (born 1925), French businessman

Franco-Provençal-language surnames